Food Democracy Now (stylized as Food Democracy Now!) is a grassroots movement and non-governmental organisation based in Iowa and was founded in 2008. 

The stated aims of Food Democracy Now are to build a sustainable food system that protects the natural environment, sustain farmers and nourish families. 

Its members organise online campaigns and in-person actions across the United States. The movement was founded in 2007 by activists Dave Murphy and Lisa Stokke.

Food Democracy Now has focused on lobbying, litigation, labeling ballot initiatives and public relations efforts around opposition to organic and GMO coexistence and campaigns against corporate control of agriculture and food.

Soon after the creation of Food Democracy Now!, a campaign was launched by the organisation to create a show of public support for twelve candidates for undersecretary appointments in the U.S. Department of Agriculture who were supportive of the organisation's aims. This campaign was successful, attracting nearly 100,000 signatures of support. 

The movement has been vocal in its support of small farmers, GMO labelling, and its opposition to the Farmer Assurance Provision; often referred to as the "Monsanto Protection Act" by anti-GMO activists, and the genetic modification of foods.

References

Organizations established in 2007
Non-profit organizations based in Iowa
Environmental organizations based in the United States